Katusha or Katyusha is a diminutive of the Russian name Ekaterina or Yekaterina, the Russian form of Katherine or Catherine.

Katusha or Katyusha may refer to:

Military use
Katyusha rocket launcher, Soviet rocket launcher of World War II, named after the song
Tupolev SB, a Soviet medium bomber of World War II
Soviet K-class submarine, nicknamed Katyusha

Other uses
Katyusha (moth), a synonym of the moth genus Lygephila in the family Erebidae
"Katyusha" (song), a Russian wartime song about a girl longing for her beloved
Team Katusha, a Swiss professional cycling team
Katusha Demidova, a Russian ballroom dancer
1900 Katyusha, an asteroid
Katyusha, a character in the Japanese anime franchise Girls und Panzer, named after the song.